Thomas Perkins Lowman Hunt (1802 in Whitchurch, Dorset – 18 August 1851 in Godlingstone near Swanage) was an English speech therapist, inventor of a method claiming to cure stammering.

Life
Hunt was born in Dorset in 1802, and is stated to have been educated at Winchester, Hampshire. He entered Trinity College, Cambridge in 1822, with the intention of becoming a minister of the church of England, but the experience of a fellow-collegian who stammered is said to have arrested his attention, and he left Cambridge without taking a degree in order to devote himself to the study and cure of what he called 'defective utterance'. He found that the lips, the tongue, the jaws, and the breath were in different cases the offending members. Thinking that he was able to cure stammering, he sought wider experience in a provincial tour, and finally in 1827 settled in Regent Street, London. He relied on simple common-sense directions. Each case was studied separately. Sometimes slow and sometimes rapid articulation was recommended to his patients, others were taught to place their tongues in particular positions, and others practised improved means of breathing. He held that not one case in fifty was the consequence of malorganisation, and objected to surgical operations. At an early date, 1828, he was patronised by Sir John Forbes, M.D., F.R.S., who sent him pupils for twenty-four years. When George Pearson, the chief witness in the case respecting the attempt on the life of Queen Victoria made by John Francis on 30 May 1842, was brought into court, he was incapable of giving utterance to his evidence, but after a fortnight's instruction from Hunt he spoke with perfect readiness, a fact certified by Sir Peter Laurie, the sitting magistrate. The Lancet of 16 May 1846 made a severe attack on Hunt as an unlicensed practitioner. Hunt ably replied in the Literary Gazette of 30 May. His leisure was spent in Dorset, where he cultivated land, and made agricultural improvements and experiments. In 1849 his numerous pupils, belonging to all professions, in commemoration of his twenty-two years' service, subscribed for his bust in marble, which was modelled by Joseph Durham, and exhibited in the Royal Academy.

He died at Godlingstone, near Swanage, Dorset, on 18 Aug. 1851, leaving his practice to his son James Hunt. His widow, Mary, died 25 Jan. 1855, aged 49.

References

Attribution

1802 births
1851 deaths
People from Purbeck District
Speech and language pathologists